Comet Lulin (official designation C/2007 N3 (Lulin), Traditional Chinese:鹿林彗星) is a non-periodic comet. It was discovered by Ye Quanzhi and Lin Chi-Sheng from Lulin Observatory.

Discovery 
The comet was first photographed by astronomer Lin Chi-Sheng (林啟生) with a  telescope at the Lulin Observatory in Nantou, Taiwan on July 11, 2007.  However, it was the 19-year-old Ye Quanzhi (葉泉志) from Sun Yat-sen University in China, who identified the new object from three of the photographs taken by Lin.

Initially, the object was thought to be a magnitude 18.9 asteroid, but images taken a week after the discovery with a larger  telescope revealed the presence of a faint coma.

The discovery occurred as part of the Lulin Sky Survey project to identify small objects in the Solar System, particularly Near-Earth Objects.  The comet was named "Comet Lulin" after the observatory, and its official designation is Comet C/2007 N3.

Observations 
The comet became visible to the naked eye from dark-sky sites around February 7. It figured near the double star Zubenelgenubi on February 6, near Spica on February 15 and 16, near Gamma Virginis on February 19 and near the star cluster M44 on March 5 and 6.  It also figured near the planetary nebula NGC 2392 on March 14, and near the double star Wasat around March 17. The comet was near conjunction with Saturn on February 23, and outward-first headed towards its aphelion, against the present position of background stars, in the direction of Regulus in the constellation of Leo, as noted on February 26 and 27, 2009. It passed near Comet Cardinal on May 12, 2009.

According to NASA, Comet Lulin's green color comes from a combination of gases that make up its local atmosphere, primarily diatomic carbon, which appears as a green glow when illuminated by sunlight in the vacuum of space. Comet Lulin was methanol-rich.

Orbit 
Astronomer Brian Marsden of the Smithsonian Astrophysical Observatory calculated that Comet Lulin reached its perihelion on January 10, 2009, at a distance of 113 million miles (182 million kilometers) from the Sun.

The orbit of Comet Lulin is very nearly a parabola (parabolic trajectory), according to Marsden.  The comet had an epoch 2009 eccentricity of 0.999986, and has an epoch 2010 eccentricity of 0.999998.  It is moving in a retrograde orbit at a very low inclination of just 1.6° from the ecliptic.

Given the extreme orbital eccentricity of this object, different epochs can generate quite different heliocentric unperturbed two-body best fit solutions to the aphelion distance (maximum distance) of this object. For objects at such high eccentricity, the sun's barycentric coordinates are more stable than heliocentric coordinates. Using JPL Horizons, the barycentric orbital elements for epoch 2014-Jan-01 generate a semi-major axis of about 1200 AU and a period of about 42,000 years.

Disconnected tail 
On February 4, 2009, a team of Italian astronomers witnessed "an intriguing phenomenon in Comet Lulin's tail". Team leader Ernesto Guido explains: "We photographed the comet using a remotely controlled telescope in New Mexico, and our images clearly showed a disconnection event. While we were looking, part of the comet's plasma tail was torn away."

Guido and colleagues believe the event was caused by a magnetic disturbance in the solar wind hitting the comet. Magnetic mini-storms in comet tails have been observed before—most famously in 2007, when NASA's STEREO spacecraft watched a coronal mass ejection crash into Comet Encke. Encke lost its tail in dramatic fashion, much as Comet Lulin did on February 4.

See also
 List of Solar System objects by greatest aphelion

References

External links 

 
 
 8 hour time sequence, from the live web cast 
 Green Comet Approaches Earth, February 4, 2009 
 C/2007 N3 (Lulin) Orbital elements
 Comet Lulin full-page finder charts
 Comet Lulin photo gallery
 Comet Lulin Comes Calling
 Sky Show Tonight: Green "Two-Tailed" Comet Arrives
 Time-Lapse Movie of Comet Lulin moving in the night sky, with stars steady
 Time-Lapse Movie of Comet Lulin moving in the night sky, with comet steady
 Drawing of Lulin's antitail structure
 
 Orbital simulation from JPL (Java) / Horizons Ephemeris

Non-periodic comets
20070711